Hyperolius parallelus, also known as the Angolan reed frog (being treated as Hyperolius angolensis by many authors), is a species of frog in the family Hyperoliidae. It is found in Southern and Central Africa. It is part of the so-called Hyperolius viridiflavus species complex and has a complex history of taxonomic treatments.

Description
In samples from Central Africa, adult males measure  in snout–vent length. The tympanum is not visible. The head and snout are short. The syntypes were dorsally dark brown with three white, parallel bands; nevertheless, the dorsal pattern is variable.

Distribution and habitat
Hyperolius parallelus is found in southern Republic of the Congo and Democratic Republic of the Congo, Angola, northern Namibia and Botswana, and western Zambia; the exact limits of its range are not clear and might extend into Gabon and Zimbabwe. It occurs in savanna, grassland and bush land, as well as many human-modified habitats such as cultivated land, towns, and gardens; it is associated in with emergent vegetation at the margins of swamps, rivers and lakes. Reproduction takes place in both temporary and permanent bodies of water and the eggs are laid directly into the water.

Conservation
This widespread and extremely abundant species is not facing any significant threats; it readily colonizes newly created waterbodies. It probably is present in many protected areas.

References

parallelus
Frogs of Africa
Amphibians of Angola
Amphibians of Botswana
Amphibians of the Democratic Republic of the Congo
Amphibians of Namibia
Amphibians of the Republic of the Congo
Amphibians of Zambia
Taxa named by Albert Günther
Amphibians described in 1858
Taxonomy articles created by Polbot